Paul Barbour "Shorty" Parker (July 9, 1898 – March 12, 1960) was an American football and basketball coach. He served as the head football coach at Ball Teachers College, Eastern Division, Indiana State Normal School—renamed Ball State Teachers College in 1929 and now known as Ball State University—from 1928 to 1929, compiling a record of 3–9–2. Parker was also the head basketball coach at Ball State from 1925 to 1930, tallying a mark of 55–34.

Early life and college career
Parker was born in 1898, in Greentown, Indiana, to Edmund L. and Elizabeth Parker.  He attended school in Kokomo, Indiana, graduating from Kokomo High School in 1917.  Parker served as a non-commissioned officer in the United States Army during World War I, before attending Indiana University.

Death
Parker died on March 12, 1960, in Springfield, Ohio.

Head coaching record

Football

References

1898 births
1960 deaths
American men's basketball players
United States Army personnel of World War I
Ball State Cardinals football coaches
Ball State Cardinals men's basketball coaches
Baseball players from Indiana
Basketball coaches from Indiana
Basketball players from Indiana
Indiana Hoosiers men's basketball players
People from Greentown, Indiana
People from Kokomo, Indiana
Players of American football from Indiana
United States Army soldiers